Creswell Crags is an enclosed limestone gorge on the border between Derbyshire and Nottinghamshire, England, near the villages of Creswell and Whitwell. The cliffs in the ravine contain several caves that were occupied during the last ice age, between around 43,000 and 10,000 years ago. Its caves contain the northernmost cave art in Europe. The evidence of occupation found in the rich series of sediments that accumulated over many thousands of years is regarded as internationally unique in demonstrating how prehistoric people managed to live at the extreme  northernmost limits of their territory during the Late Pleistocene period.

The caves contain occupation layers with evidence of flint tools from the Mousterian, proto-Solutrean, Creswellian and Maglemosian cultures. They were seasonally occupied by nomadic groups of people during the Upper Palaeolithic and Mesolithic periods. Evidence of Neolithic, Bronze Age, Roman and post-medieval activity has also been found there. There is evidence of Neanderthal occupation 50,000–60,000 years ago, a brief Gravettian occupation around 32,000 years ago and use of all the main caves during the Magdalenian around 14,000 years ago. The site is open to the public and has a visitor centre with a small museum of objects associated with the caves, including a stuffed cave hyena.

As a result of its unique features, Creswell Crags has been designated as a Site of Special Scientific Interest (SSSI). It has also been put forward as a potential World Heritage Site.

Neanderthal and Upper Palaeolithic occupation

Creswell Crags and  Whitwell Gap 
Before Creswell village was built around the colliery in the late 19th century, there were only farms around the entrance to the Crags. The local Anglo Saxon villages were Whitwell, Elmton and Thorpe (Salvin). Creswell was the name of the farm nearest to the colliery site, and so a drop-off point for materials used in the building of the colliery. At that time Creswell Crags was known locally as Whitwell Crags. The Crags may be what was referred to by the Anglo Saxon poets who recorded King Alfred's grandson, King Edmund, conquering the 5 boroughs from the Viking Earls in 942 AD, reaching as far as Dore and "Hwitan Wylles Geat" (the Whitwell Gap).

Caves

The most occupied caves were:

Mother Grundy's Parlour, which has produced numerous flint tools and split bones and was occupied until Mesolithic times.
Robin Hood's Cave, the location of a bone engraved with a horse's head and evidence that its occupants hunted and trapped woolly rhinoceros and Arctic hare.
The Pin Hole, the location of the Pinhole Cave Man, a human figure engraved on bone and discovered in the 1920s, and an ivory pin with etched lines.
Church Hole, with more than 80 engravings on its walls and occupied intermittently until Roman times.

Finds

A bone engraved with a horse's head and other worked bone items along with the remains of a variety of prehistoric animals have been found in excavations since 1876, including hyenas and hippopotami. The "Ochre Horse" was found on 29 June 1876 at the back of the western chamber in the Robin Hood Cave.

In 2003, the Ochre Horse was estimated to be between 11,000 and 13,000 years old.

Cave art
In April 2003, engravings and bas-reliefs were found on the walls and ceilings of some of the caves, an important find as it had previously been thought that no British cave art existed. The discoveries, made by Paul Bahn, Sergio Rippoll and Paul Pettitt, included an animal figure at first thought to be an ibex but later identified as a stag. Later finds included carvings on the ceiling of Church Hole Cave, the rarity of which made the site one of international importance.

To this day the finds at Creswell Crags represent the most northerly finds in Europe. Their subject matter includes representations of animals including bison and, arguably, several different bird species. Some workers, however, consider that the "bird" figures are more likely to be female anthropomorphs. The engravers seem to have made use of the naturally uneven cave surface in their carvings and it is likely that they relied on the early-morning sunlight entering the caves to illuminate the art.

Thin layers of calcium carbonate flowstone overlaying some of the engravings were dated using the uranium-series disequilibrium method, which showed the oldest of these flowstones to have formed at least 12,800 years ago. This provides a minimum age for the underlying engraving. The scientists and archaeologists concluded that it was most likely the engravings were contemporary with evidence for occupation at the site during the late glacial interstadial around 13,000–15,000 years ago. Most of the engravings are found in Church Hole Cave on the Nottinghamshire side of the gorge. Since this discovery, however, an engraved reindeer from a cave on the Gower Peninsula has yielded two minimum dates (through uranium-series dating) of 12,572 years BP and 14,505 years BP.

Not all of the figures identified as prehistoric art are in fact human made. An example given by archaeologists Paul Bahn and Paul Pettitt is the 'horse-head', Which they say is ""highly visible and resembles a heavily maned horse-head... lacks any trace of work: it is a combination of erosion, black stains for the head, and natural burrow cast reliefs for the mane." Others are a 'bison-head' which they think may be natural and a 'bear' image which "lacks any evidence of human work." Notwithstanding they believe that more figures may be discovered in the future.

The site was the subject of the BBC Radio 4 documentaries Unearthing Mysteries, Nature and Drawings on the Wall, and featured in the 2005 BBC Two television programme Seven Natural Wonders, as one of the wonders of the Midlands. In the Drawings on the Wall (Episode 1) Dr Paul Pettitt was interviewed about the so-called 'naked ladies' engravings in Church Hole Cave.

World Heritage Site nomination
Creswell Crags first applied for World Heritage Site status in 1986, but was unsuccessful. Since then further research and development has been carried out and, in 2011, it was again put forward for consideration. In 2012 it was added to the United Kingdom's 'tentative list' – an essential prerequisite to formal nomination, evaluation and potential inscription as a World Heritage Site. The Tentative List identifies the universal outstanding value of Creswell Crags as being:The outstanding landscape of a narrow limestone gorge containing a complex of caves having long-intact palaeoenvironmental cave and gorge sediment sequences, containing rich cultural archaeological remains as well as diverse animal bone, plant macro- and micro-fossil assemblages
In situ Palaeolithic rock art on the walls and ceilings of caves, dated directly to 13,000 years ago, providing direct cultural associations with Late Magdalenian human groups operating at extreme northern latitudes

In addition, Creswell Crags' significance has been enhanced by the discovery of a number of pieces of portable art made of engraved bone – the UK's only known figurative Ice Age art – as well as assemblages of bone, stone and ivory tools.

See also
William Boyd Dawkins
Hamburg culture
Ahrensburg culture
Palaeolithic art
Swanscombe

References

Further reading
Bahn, P. "The Cresswell Caves Rock Art", Appendix VII in: Beckensall, S., (2009), Prehistoric Rock Art in Britain, Stroud, Amberley Publishing, .

A. W. G. Pike, M. Gilmour, P. Pettitt, R. Jacobi, S. Ripoll, P. Bahn and F. Muñoz (2005) "Verification of the age of the Palaeolithic rock art at Creswell," Journal of Archaeological Science 32, 1649–1655.

External links

Creswell Crags website
BBC News article on the cave art
Listen to a BBC Radio 4 Programme – Unearthing Mysteries
Listen to a BBC Radio 4 Programme – Nature, The Animal Image

1876 archaeological discoveries
Archaeological sites in Derbyshire
Canyons and gorges of England
Caves of Derbyshire
Sites of Special Scientific Interest in Derbyshire
Sites of Special Scientific Interest in Nottinghamshire
Escarpments of England
Archaeological sites in England
2003 archaeological discoveries
Neanderthal sites
Scheduled monuments in Derbyshire
Scheduled monuments in Nottinghamshire
Paleoanthropological sites
Caves containing pictograms
Mousterian